Jishui may refer to

 Jishui River, another name for the Ji River in Shandong
 Jishui County, Ji'an, Jiangxi
 Jishui River in Tainan, Taiwan
 Jishui, the IAU-approved proper name for the star Omicron Geminorum

See also
 Ji River